Apradhi Kaun? is a 1982 Indian Hindi-language mystery film directed by Mohan Bhakri and produced by K.M. Bhakri. It marked the debut of Javed Khan.

Plot 

The story revolves around a young boy, Anand, who is wrongfully accused of the murder of a lady, Madhvi, who was bored with her marriage and eyed Anand. Anand is blackmailed with pictures and threats.

Cast 
 Javed Khan as Anand
 Raza Murad
 Iftekhar
 Dara Singh
 Tun Tun
 Om Shivpuri
 Madan Puri
 Ram Mohan
 Rajendra Nath
 Manorama
 Birbal
 Arpana Chaudhry

Soundtrack 
The film's music was composed by Nadeem–Shravan. It has only one song, "Ek Raat Sunsaan Sadak Se", sung by Amit Kumar.

References

External links 
 

1980s Hindi-language films
1980s mystery films
1982 films
Films scored by Nadeem–Shravan
Indian mystery films